A Tonic for the Troops is the second album by Irish rock band The Boomtown Rats, released in June 1978.

A Tonic for the Troops peaked at No. 8 on the UK Albums Chart in 1978. The album included the singles "She's So Modern", "Like Clockwork" and "Rat Trap". "She's So Modern" reached number 12 on the UK Singles Chart. The most commercially successful track on the album was "Rat Trap", which made it to Number 1 on the UK Singles Chart.

Background
The album featured dark themes in an often upbeat, pop-punk style. One of the album's tracks, "(I Never Loved) Eva Braun", was described by one critic as "the happiest, cheeriest, best upbeat song about Hitler ever written." The lyrics of other songs discussed suicide ("Living in an Island") and euthanasia ("Can't Stop").

The album's title was taken from a line in "She's So Modern": "And Charlie ain't no Nazi/ she likes to wear her leather boots/ 'cuz it's exciting for the veterans/ and it's a tonic for the troops."

"Rat Trap" was the final cut on the UK version of the album but the opening track on the US version.

Reception

Rolling Stone critic Tom Carson described A Tonic for the Troops as "an inventive and melodically forceful piece of work, glossily ingratiating all the way", but also found the band "far too impressed by their own wit to be particularly incisive or convincing musically." Robert Christgau of The Village Voice was more positive, remarking that while the album "does turn rather campy at times... it will certainly do." He concluded: "I'll take a good calculating song about Adolf Hitler over an ordinary calculating song about the perils of romance any day, and if you're heading your music toward the rock mainstream, wit and flash don't hurt."

Track listing
All songs written by Bob Geldof except where indicated.

LP British version
SIDE 1
 "Like Clockwork" (Bob Geldof, Pete Briquette, Simon Crowe)
 "Blind Date"
 "(I Never Loved) Eva Braun"
 "Living in an Island"
 "Don't Believe What You Read"
SIDE 2
 "She's So Modern" (Geldof, Johnnie Fingers)
 "Me and Howard Hughes"
 "Can't Stop"
 "(Watch Out For) The Normal People"
 "Rat Trap"

CD British version
 "Like Clockwork" (Bob Geldof, Pete Briquette, Simon Crowe)
 "Blind Date"
 "(I Never Loved) Eva Braun"
 "She's So Modern" (Geldof, Johnnie Fingers) (Track 6 – 1 on Side 2 – on the European version)
 "Don't Believe What You Read"
 "Living in an Island" 
 "Me and Howard Hughes"
 "Can't Stop"
 "(Watch Out For) The Normal People"
 "Rat Trap"
 "Lying Again" (CD bonus track)
 "How Do You Do?" (CD bonus track)
 "So Strange" (CD bonus track)

American LP version
SIDE 1
 "Rat Trap"
 "Me and Howard Hughes"
 "(I Never Loved) Eva Braun"
 "Living in an Island"
 "Like Clockwork" (Geldof, Briquette, Crowe)
SIDE 2
 "Blind Date"
 "Mary of the 4th Form" (a re-recorded version of the original found on their first LP The Boomtown Rats)
 "Don't Believe What You Read"
 "She's So Modern" (Geldof, Fingers)
 "Joey's on the Street Again" (from The Boomtown Rats)

Personnel
Credits adapted from album liner notes and AllMusic.

The Boomtown Rats
 Bob Geldof – vocals, saxophone
 Pete Briquette – bass, vocals
 Gerry Cott – guitar
 Johnnie Fingers – keyboards, vocals
 Simon Crowe – drums, vocals
 Garry Roberts – guitar, vocals

Additional musicians
 Alan Holmes – saxophone

Technical
 The Boomtown Rats – production
 Stuff Brown – engineering
 Fin Costello – photography
 Chalkie Davies – photography
 Tim Friese-Greene – engineering
 Hothouse – artwork, design
 Chuck Loyola – painting
 Robert John "Mutt" Lange – production

Charts

Certifications

Footnotes

References

1978 albums
The Boomtown Rats albums
Albums produced by Robert John "Mutt" Lange